The 2009–10 South West Peninsula League season was the third in the history of the South West Peninsula League, a football competition in England, that feeds the Premier Division of the Western Football League. The league had been formed in 2007 from the merger of the Devon County League and the South Western League, and is restricted to clubs based in Cornwall and Devon. The Premier Division of the South West Peninsula League is on the same level of the National League System as the Western League Division One.

The champions for the first time in their history were Buckland Athletic.

Premier Division

The Premier Division featured 20 teams, the same as the previous season. Two new clubs joined the league after Newton Abbot were expelled and Newton Abbot Spurs were relegated to Division One East:

Bovey Tracey, runners-up in Division One East.
Penzance, champions of Division One West.

League table

Division One East
Division One East consisted of eighteen clubs, the same as the previous season.
Bovey Tracey were promoted to the Premier Division and Buckfastleigh Rangers had resigned during the previous season. They were replaced by Newton Abbot Spurs (relegated from the Premier Division) and Bickleigh.

Division One West
Division One West consisted of seventeen clubs, the same as the previous season.
Penzance were promoted to the Premier Division and were replaced by Perranporth.

References

External links
 South West Peninsula League

South West Peninsula League
10